Liskeard railway station serves the town of Liskeard in Cornwall, England. It is the junction for the Looe Valley Line.

History

Cornwall Railway
The station opened with the Cornwall Railway on 4 May 1859. It was described at the time as occupying "an elevated position nearly a mile to the south of the town", the main building "stands considerably above the rails, the descent to which is by a long flight of steps, which will be hereafter, we understand, entirely covered in. The building is of stone, having a large verandah projecting over the road. On the opposite side of the line is the arrival station, which is also a stone erection; and to the south of this, is the goods shed, which is a timber structure, having warehouses and offices at the ends".

Traffic at the new station was sufficient to warrant additional goods sidings before the end of the year. There is no evidence that the steps from the booking office were ever covered, instead they were replaced with a slope in 1866.

Looe branch
A railway had run to Looe from Moorswater, in the valley west of Liskeard, since 27 December 1860. On 25 February 1901 the Liskeard and Looe Railway was extended up to the Great Western Railway station, this extension line opening to passengers on 15 May 1901.

The Liskeard and Looe Railway arrived at right angles to the main line at a dedicated platform with its own buildings; Liskeard therefore has, in essence, two stations. Trains start their journey by travelling northwards, away from Looe. They swing round towards the south, descend gradients as steep as 1 in 40 to pass below the Liskeard Viaduct, swing back towards the north, and then reverse at Coombe Junction for the remainder of their journey to Looe. In the days of steam locomotives, there was an extended stop at Coombe to enable the locomotive to run around to the front of the train when reversing direction. If someone just missed a train leaving Liskeard for Looe, it was possible to run down the hill to Coombe and pick up the train from there.

A connection in the goods yard allowed goods trains and empty carriages to be exchanged between the main line and the branch. A separate Liskeard Branch signal box was opened with the loop line to control trains going to Coombe Junction. It was closed on 15 March 1964, since when the connection to the main line is operated from a ground frame.

Later history
The Cornwall Railway was amalgamated into the Great Western Railway on 1 July 1889 and the Liskeard and Looe Railway did the same on 1 January 1923. The Great Western Railway was nationalised into British Railways from 1 January 1948 which was then privatised in the 1990s.

The station was modernised in 2004. A brick extension to the original Brunel-designed building was replaced by a light and airy glass structure. This work was entered into annual National Railway Heritage Awards in 2005 and won the Network Rail Partnership Award.

Accidents and incidents
Two unusual accidents have occurred at Liskeard due to its elevated position. No one was hurt in either incident.

In April 1863 a goods train was incorrectly sent into a siding where it collided with some wagons standing there. The impact sent these through the buffer stop and over the edge of the embankment.

On 15 June 1906, five empty carriages ran away from the branch platform during shunting operations. They ran down the gradient to Coombe Junction and along the line to Moorswater where they ran into the shed, knocking down the shed wall.

Stationmasters

Sampson Rogers ca. 1861 ca. 1862
Joseph H. Coggins until 1871 (dismissed after a shunting accident at the station)
William H.H. Wright 1871 - 1897 (formerly station master at Penryn, afterwards offered position of station master at Truro but unable to take it due to illness)
William Francis Shepherd Lewarn 1897  - 1909
Dan Silvester 1909 - 1917 (formerly station master at Helston, afterwards station master at St Austell)
A. Charles Foster 1917 - 1919 (afterwards station master at Paignton)
James R.H. Tucker 1919 - 1925 (formerly station master at Lostwithiel)
A.T. Harris ca. 1928
Frederick Herbert Wherly 1928 - 1941 (formerly station master at Par)
G.P. Miller 1941 - 1953
Tom Pickard 1953 - 1963

Location

The main line platforms flank the double-track line in a deep cutting, which is crossed at high level by a road bridge and at lower level by the station footbridge. At each end of the platforms, the line dips down towards flanking viaducts, the Liskeard viaduct to the east and the Moorswater viaduct to the west. The Isambard Kingdom Brunel-designed booking office is at high level next to the road. A curved glazed canopy overlooking the line was added in 2004 by Robert Allen Architects. 

The station retains semaphore signalling worked from a signal box at the Plymouth end of the westbound platform.

Platform layout 
There is step-free access to all platforms. Trains to Looe leave from a separate terminal platform at a right angles to the main platforms at the eastern end of the northern platform. The Looe platform is separated from the rest of the station by an access road between them, and has its own range of station buildings which were built around 1901 to the designs of John Sansom.

Cross-overs at either end of the main line platforms permit main line trains to reverse at Liskeard, and a sharply curved link line permits freight trains and empty passenger trains to reach the Looe line.

Passenger volume

Liskeard is the second busiest (behind Truro) of the Cornish junction stations, with more than ¼ million passengers each year. Comparing the year from April 2007 to that which started in April 2002, passenger numbers increased by 31%.

The statistics cover twelve month periods that start in April.

Services

Liskeard is served by most Great Western Railway trains on the Cornish Main Line between Penzance and Plymouth. Some trains run through to or from London Paddington, including the Night Riviera overnight sleeping car service and the Golden Hind which offers an early morning service to London and an evening return. Other fast trains are the mid-morning Cornish Riviera and the afternoon Royal Duchy. The basic service on the Cornish Main Line is one or two  trains an hour in each direction (to Penzance and Plymouth), although a few peak period trains start/terminate here.

There is no Sunday service in the winter.

Community rail
The railway between Liskeard and Looe is designated as a community rail line. It is supported by marketing provided by the Devon and Cornwall Rail Partnership and promoted under the "Looe Valley Line" name. The signs on the Looe Valley platform were replaced in 2007 with brown and cream signs in the style used by the Western Region of British Railways in the 1950s and 1960s.

The "Old Stag Inn" (now closed) opposite the station is included in the Looe Valley Line rail ale trail, as is the "White Horse" in the town centre.

References

Further reading

External links

Railway stations in Cornwall
Former Great Western Railway stations
Railway stations in Great Britain opened in 1859
Former Liskeard and Looe Railway stations
Railway stations in Great Britain opened in 1901
Isambard Kingdom Brunel railway stations
Railway stations served by Great Western Railway
Railway stations served by CrossCountry
Liskeard
DfT Category D stations